Ruggeri is a surname, which may refer to:

Alessandro Ruggeri (b. 1990), Italian professional football player
Andrea Ruggeri (b. 1982), Italian international relations scholar
Davide Ruggeri (b. 1999), Italian rugby union player
Enrico Ruggeri (b. 1957), Italian singer-songwriter
Guido Ruggeri, Italian engraver
Matteo Ruggeri (b. 2002), Italian professional footballer 
Oscar Ruggeri (b. 1962), Argentine football player
Paola Ruggeri (b. 1961), Miss Venezuela 1983 
Paul Ruggeri (b. 1988), American gymnast 
Ruggero Ruggeri (1871–1953), Italian actor
Telemaco Ruggeri (1876–1957), Italian actor and film director
Teresa Ruggeri, Italian operatic soprano
Valerio Ruggeri (1934-2015), Italian actor and voice actor 
Rugeri or Ruggeri, 17th-century family of Italian violin makers

See also 
 Ruggieri

Italian-language surnames
Patronymic surnames
Surnames from given names